Vojislav "Voja" Mirić (7 April 1933 – 23 April 2019) was a Serbian television and film actor most noted for his role as Ahmed Nurudin in the 1974 Yugoslav movie Dervis i smrt (popularly known as Death and the Dervish).

Life
Vojislav "Voja" Mirić was born on 7 April 1933 in Trstenik, central Serbia. His film career spanned over 30 years. His first appearance on television was in the series Veliki poduhvat in 1960. In 1964 he won the "Silver Arena" award as Best Actor in the Pula Film Festival of Yugoslavian Films for the Fadil Hadžić movie Službeni položaj. His most notable performance came as the medieval Bosnian Dervish in the 1974 movie Derviš i smrt (The Dervish and Death). His last appearance was in Amnezija in 1994.

References

Further reading
 Pavle Levi, Disintegration in Frames: Aesthetics and Ideology in the Yugoslav and Post-Yugoslav Cinema, Stanford University Press; 1 edition (February 1, 2007); 
 Daniel J. Goulding, Liberated Cinema, Revised and Expanded Edition: The Yugoslav Experience, 1945-2001, Indiana University Press; (December 31, 2002);

External links
 

1933 births
2019 deaths
Serbian male film actors
Serbian male television actors
People from Trstenik, Serbia